Vodice is a former village in central Slovenia in the Municipality of Zagorje ob Savi. It is now part of the village of Jablana. It is part of the traditional region of Upper Carniola and is now included in the Central Sava Statistical Region.

Geography
Vodice stands northeast of the village center of Jablana. It is accessible by a side road that passes below Holy Cross Church parallel to the main road to Čolnišče.

Name
The name Vodice is ultimately derived from the Slovene common noun vodica, a diminutive of voda 'water, creek'. The name may therefore be based on the singular locative form *Vodicě (literally, 'by the small creek'), or it may have originally been plural, referring to springs in the area.

History
Vodice had a population of 28 (in three houses) in 1890 and 21 (in three houses) in 1900. Together with Kal, Vodice was annexed by Jablana in 1953, ending its existence as a separate settlement.

References

External links
Vodice on Geopedia

Populated places in the Municipality of Zagorje ob Savi
Former settlements in Slovenia